The Miss Viet Nam Continents is a beauty pageant for women from Vietnam or of Vietnamese descent that is held annually in the United States. MVNC, the organizer, also hosts a Mrs. Viet Nam Continents, and a Mr. Viet Nam Continents pageant.

Competition rounds
Prior to the final telecast the delegates compete in the preliminary competition, which involves private interviews with the judges and showcasing their evening gown and swimsuits for the judges for scoring. During the final competition, the semi-finalists are announced and go on to compete in swimsuit and evening gown and questions and answers.

History
The first edition of Miss Viet Nam Continents pageant was held August 13, 2011 in Long Beach, California. The pageant is a combine entertainment and pageant show. Each year there are a number of line up performances for the night.

Editions

Titleholders

References

External links
 Official Miss Viet Nam Continents Website
 Official Mr Viet Nam Continents Website
 Official Mrs Viet Nam Continents Website

Beauty pageants in the United States
2011 establishments in California
Vietnamese-American culture
Beauty pageants for people of specific ethnic or national descents
Lists of Vietnamese women